El Hadj Sega Ngom  (born 24 June 1990) is a Senegalese football striker who currently plays for Norwegian Second Division side Finnsnes.

He started his career in Yeggo Foot Pro. Then in 2010 he signed a contract for  Alta. In 2011, he was loaned out to Tromsø.

After six seasons in Alta he went on to Finnsnes IL ahead of the 2017 season.

Career statistics

References

1990 births
Living people
Footballers from Dakar
Senegalese footballers
Alta IF players
Tromsø IL players
Norwegian First Division players
Eliteserien players
Senegalese expatriate footballers
Senegalese expatriate sportspeople in Norway
Expatriate footballers in Norway

Association football forwards